Pat Monahan (born 1969) is an American singer and lead singer of Train.

Patrick Monahan may also refer to:

 Patrick Monahan (comedian) (born 1976), Irish-Iranian comedian
 Patrick J. Monahan (born 1954), Canadian academic
 Pat Monaghan, ecologist

See also
 P. H. Moynihan (Patrick Henry Moynihan, 1869–1946), U.S. Representative from Illinois
 Daniel Patrick Moynihan (1927–2003), known as Pat, U.S. Senator from New York
 Patricia Monaghan, activist